A Story of Healing is a short documentary film in which Donna Dewey follows a team of five nurses, four anesthesiologists, and three plastic surgeons from Interplast in the United States for two weeks of volunteer work in the Mekong delta of Vietnam. The film shows not only how this changes the lives of the 110 patients who undergo surgery, but also the lives of the volunteers themselves. The epilogue, which runs after the credits, follows-up on two patients helped by Interplast, 16 months after their surgery.

In 1998, "A Story of Healing" won the Academy Award for Best Documentary (Short Subject). In 2007, it became the first Oscar-winning film to be licensed under a Creative Commons license when it was opened under the Attribution-NonCommercial-NoDerivatives License.

References

External links 
 
 Get the code to embed "A Story of Healing" on any website (click "Share") - includes epilogue (archived)
 Interplast
 A Story of Healing available for download in different formats (without epilogue) (at Internet Archive)

1990s short documentary films
1996 films
1996 short films
American short documentary films
Best Documentary Short Subject Academy Award winners
Creative Commons-licensed documentary films
Documentary films about health care
Films shot in Vietnam
American independent films
1996 independent films
1990s English-language films
1990s American films